Mount Harriet may refer to:

 A hill on the Andaman Islands which gave name to the Mount Harriet National Park
 A hill on the Falkland islands at the centre of the Battle of Mount Harriet